When Knighthood Was in Flower is a 1922 American silent historical film directed by Robert G. Vignola, based on the novel by Charles Major and play by Paul Kester. The film was produced by William Randolph Hearst (through his Cosmopolitan Productions) for Marion Davies and distributed by Paramount Pictures. This was William Powell's second film. The story was re-filmed by Walt Disney in 1953 as The Sword and the Rose, directed by Ken Annakin.

Plot
Mary Tudor is forced by her brother Henry VIII to marry Louis XII as part of a peace agreement but she falls in love with Charles Brandon. Mary flees with him, but the two lovers are captured. Brandon is framed for murder and Mary agrees to marry Louis XII if his life is spared. Brandon is exiled and Louis XII, old and sick, dies shortly after the wedding. After an attempt on the part of Louis XII's nephew Francis I to wed Mary, she finally marries Brandon.

Cast

 Marion Davies as Mary Tudor
 Forrest Stanley as Charles Brandon
 Lyn Harding as Henry VIII
 Teresa Maxwell-Conover as Queen Catherine (credited as Theresa Maxwell Conover)
 Pedro de Cordoba as Duke of Buckingham
 Ruth Shepley as Lady Jane Bolingbroke
 Ernest Glendinning as Sir Edwin Caskoden
 Arthur Forrest as Cardinal Wolsey
 Johnny Dooley as Will Sommers
 William Kent as King's tailor
 Charles K. Gerrard as Sir Adam Judson
 Arthur Donaldson as Sir Henry Brandon
 Downing Clarke as Lord Chamberlain
 William Norris as Louis XII
 Macey Harlam as Duc de Longueville
 William Powell as Francis I (credited as William H. Powell)
 George Nash as An adventurer
 Gustav von Seyffertitz as Grammont
 Paul Panzer as Captain of the Guard
 Flora Finch as French countess
 Guy Coombs as Follower of Buckingham

Production 
Exteriors were shot at Windsor Castle, England. With an estimated cost of $1,500,000, it was considered by Life "the most expensive film that has ever been produced" in 1922. According to Variety, William Randolph Hearst launched "the most expensive and extensive campaign that has ever been organized for anything theatrical", with over 650 billboards in New York, 300 subway advertising placards, special booths in department stores that sold souvenir books, and a dazzling string of electric signs that pervaded Times Square, upon which Will Rogers quipped that Davies's next film would be titled When Electric Light Was in Power.

Marion Davies makes her entrance coming down the river on a royal barge. The barge was a full-sized replica built in Bridgeport, Connecticut. The scene and the dance were filmed on the Laddins Rock Farm in Stamford/Old Greenwich, Connecticut. Hearst commissioned two songs from Victor Herbert: "The When Knighthood Was in Flower Waltz" and "The Marion Davies March," which were played at the New York premiere.

Reception

Robert E. Sherwood defined the film "gorgeously beautiful [...]  flashily romantic and stirringly impressive", ranking it as one of the best pictures of the year and appreciated Vignola's "genius for lighting and composition". In 1922, Motion Picture News stated the film was "not only Cosmopolitan's greatest achievement [but] one of the greatest achievements of the silversheet", wrote a positive review of the cast and praised Vignola "for his masterly direction".

Delight Evans cited the film among "the most entertaining photoplays ever made" on Photoplay in 1923. It was ranked #10 on Screenland'''s reader poll of "The Ten Best Screenplays Ever Made" in 1924. The Motion Picture Guide praised the film for its "tremendous production values, excellent direction, a good script, and an outstanding cast", giving it three out of four stars.

It was a triumph for Marion Davies, and she was named "Queen of the Screen" and the #1 female box office star of 1922 at the annual theater owners ball (Rudolph Valentino was named #1 male star). However, the movie was negatively received in London and, according to Davies, the English did not accept an American woman playing an English character. Despite the controversy, it was appreciated by Edward, Prince of Wales, who defined it "a wonderful picture". British art dealer Joseph Duveen stated the film setting was "the most stupendous reproduction of Henry the Eighth court life that has ever been achieved — a marvelous piece of artistry".

Legacy
The film was spoofed in Broncho Billy Anderson's When Knights Were Cold'' (1923), starring Stan Laurel and Mae Dahlberg.

Ben Model used portions of the songs commissioned by Hearst for the film's New York premiere in his score for the 2017 restoration of the film.

References

External links

 
 
 
 
 When Knighthood Was in Flower at Virtual History

1922 films
1920s English-language films
American silent feature films
American historical films
Films based on American novels
American films based on plays
Films directed by Robert G. Vignola
1920s historical films
Films set in the 16th century
Films set in England
Films based on adaptations
Films about Henry VIII
American black-and-white films
Surviving American silent films
1920s American films